is a Japanese  company located in Tokyo which is involved in the business of planning and producing adult videos. To date, the company has produced over 3,500 titles starring some of the most prominent adult video actresses.

Company information
IdeaPocket split off from the Attackers corporation and was founded as a separate entity in 2002 under the umbrella of the Hokuto Corporation group of companies. It had previously been a stand-alone label used on works produced by the Attackers studio in their "Angel" series of cosplay videos to distinguish them from the more hardcore simulated rape movies produced for the Attackers Shark label. The first of the "Angel" videos, released in December 1998 and labeled AN-001, starred actress Ryo Hitomi while a later installment in the series featured AV Idol Sally Yoshino. Further labels were later added and the company now has a reputation as one of the top studios in the Japanese adult video industry combining high production values and good performances.

The company website, www.ideapocket.com, which has been online since June 19, 2002, has an audience drawn almost 79% from Japan and about 3% each from Hong Kong, the United States, and Indonesia. IdeaPocket releases about 17-18 videos per month comprising both original works and compilations and the large Japanese online video distributor DMM (part of the Hokuto Corporation) listed more than 1175 DVD and nearly 450 VHS titles available under the IdeaPocket name in mid-2010. Several of the studio's new videos have also been released in Blu-ray format. IdeaPocket released its first 3D video, starring Mayu Nozomi, on September 1, 2011. In April 2013, IdeaPocket started a working relationship with professional wrestling promotion Union Pro Wrestling, which led to the introduction of the World Aipoke Championship title.

At present, the company retails most of their content via their official website and Hokutu Corporation's DMM and Fanza platforms, generating hundreds of millions in sales globally. In fact, many fans have even requested that the company incorporate subtitles as part of their videos to enhance the viewing experience.

Moodyz Awards
The IdeaPocket studio started to take part in the year-end Moodyz Awards ceremony beginning in 2004. At the 2005 gathering, the studio presented awards to some of its own personnel but in the following years, 2006 to 2008, IdeaPocket competed for awards with various other Hokuto Corporation associated companies. In 2008, the IdeaPocket video High School Girl and Sex with Rion Hatsumi won the Best Title award.

AV Grand Prix
IdeaPocket was one of the companies participating in the 2008 AV Grand Prix competition with their entry Shimiken's Private 7 FUCK (labeled AVGL-001) starring actor Ken Shimizu and actresses Chihiro Hara, Mangetsu Sakuragawa, Nene, Kaede Akina, Natsuki Sugisaki, Yua Aida and Marin. The video took the Best Miscellaneous Video award. The studio's entry for the 2009 AV Grand Prix was a multiple actress compilation GAL CIR 3, labeled AVGL-101, which was given a "Special Award - Variety Video" at the contest.

Labels
Labels used by IdeaPocket and the first part of their associated product codes:
 Angel (AN for VHS tapes and AND for DVDs)
 Colors (COSD)
 High School Pink (HPD)
 Ideapocket Best (IDBD)
 Supreme (SUPD)
 Tissue (IPTD, IPZ, IPX)
 Virtual Ex

Directors
Major directors at IdeaPocket include:

 Akinaga
 [Jo]Style
 Alala Kurosawa
 Takuan
 Jiro Tubuyaki
 Tadanori Usami

Actresses

Active exclusive actresses

Notable actresses 

 Yua Aida
 Hotaru Akane
 Tsubasa Amami
 Minami Aoyama
 Azusa Ayano
 Sarasa Hara
 Akie Harada
 Rion Hatsumi
 Minori Hatsune
 Honoka
 Bunko Kanazawa
 Kaho Kasumi
 Aino Kishi
 Jessica Kizaki
 Meguru Kosaka
 Ichika Kuroki
 Miho Maeshima
 Miyu Misaki
 Nozomi Momoi
 Mina Nakano
 An Nanba
 Kaho Shibuya
 Riko Tachibana
 Akira Watase
 Sally Yoshino
 Akiho Yoshizawa
 Tina Yuzuki (Rio)
 Kana Momonogi
 Airi Kijima
 Sakura Momo
 Akari Tsumugi
 Kaede Karen
 Nanami Misaki
 Minami Aizawa

Series

Popular series 

 Digital Channel
 First IdeaPocket
 First Impression
 
 
 Love Semen
 
 Spermania

References

External link
 

Japanese pornographic film studios
Japanese companies established in 2002
Mass media companies based in Tokyo
Mass media companies established in 2002
Film production companies of Japan